Lugo di Valpantena is a village in the province of Verona in Italy. It is a frazione of the comune of Grezzana.;.

Main sights

 The parish church is dedicated to Sant'Apollinare (ninth century)
 The oratory of Corso is dedicated to Saint Paul (1685)

Notable people

 Eugenio Dal Corso, (born 1939) bishop of Lodi, born in Marne

References 

Cities and towns in Veneto
Frazioni of the Province of Verona